Antichlidas holocnista is a species of moth of the family Tortricidae. It is found in China (Zhejiang, Jiangxi, Hubei, Hunan, Sichuan, Guizhou), Korea and Japan.

The wingspan is 12–18 mm.

References

Moths described in 1931
Eucosmini
Moths of Asia